Rolf de Boer is a Dutch retired footballer who is last known to have played as a striker for ACV.

Career

In 1999, de Boer, signed for South African top flight side Cape Town Spurs after trialing for KuPS in Finland, where he made 8 appearances and scored 0 goals and said, "In the Netherlands, everything is always arranged to perfection. In South Africa it is different and sometimes things go wrong. That was the case in this case. It turned out that there were no linesmen present and the corresponding flags were also missing. Then linesmen had to be sought in haste. Fortunately, we succeeded just in time, but the flags could no longer be arranged. That is why the pseudo-flags used the traditional Ajax shirts as a flag. Out of the corner of my eye I saw that my friends were 'not amused'. Afterwards they expressed their shame about the fact that the Ajax shirts were used as flags for the linesmen. Such a thing would indeed not happen with us. It's quintessentially South African." After that, he signed for ACV in the Dutch fifth division.

References

Expatriate soccer players in South Africa
Living people
Dutch footballers
Association football forwards
Dutch football managers
Cape Town Spurs F.C. players
Year of birth missing (living people)